Schiedam Nieuwland is a metro station in Schiedam in the Netherlands.  Located on the Hoekse Lijn, it is served by RET Metro Line B at all times, and Line A during peak periods.

The station is built on the bridge over the Nieuwe Damlaan, one of the principal streets northwest of the city centre of Schiedam.

History

The station was opened on 1 June 1975 as a railway station and was operated by Nederlandse Spoorwegen until 31 March 2017. The station and other infrastructure was then handed over to the Rotterdamse Elektrische Tram (RET) and closed for a 2-year period of renovation and adapting to their metro mode of transportation. The station reopened on 30 September 2019 as part of the Rotterdam Metro.

Services
As of 2019, Schiedam Nieuwland is served by 6 trains per hour on RET Metro Line B, of which 3 per hour travel the full length of the route, and 3 travel only as far as Steendijkpolder

During peak periods, the station is also served by 6 trains per hour on Line a, which travel as far as Vlaardingen West.

References

External links 
Dutch Public Transport journey planner

Rotterdam Metro stations
Railway stations opened in 1975
Railway stations on the Hoekse Lijn
Buildings and structures in Schiedam